ENIT or Enit may refer to:

 Anit, an Egyptian goddess
 ENIT, Ente Nazionale Italiano per il Turismo, the Italian national tourist board
 École nationale d'ingénieurs de Tarbes, a French engineering university
 Enit Festival, a one-night electronic music festival created by Perry Farrell in 1995